Gavidia is a surname. Notable people with the surname include:

Estela Gavidia, Salvadoran gynaecologist
Francisco Gavidia (1863-1955), Salvadoran historian, politician, educator and journalist
Gabriela Gavidia, Salvadoran beauty queen
Humberto Lara Gavidia (d. 2014), Salvadoran baseball player